{{DISPLAYTITLE:C4H8O2}}
The molecular formula C4H8O2 may refer to:

 Acetoin
 cis-Butene-1,4-diol
 Butyric acid
 Dioxanes
 1,2-Dioxane
 1,3-Dioxane
 1,4-Dioxane
 Ethyl acetate
 3-Hydroxybutanal
 γ-Hydroxybutyraldehyde
 3-Hydroxytetrahydrofuran
 Isobutyric acid
 Methyl propanoate
Propyl formate
Isopropyl formate